Pinulot Ka Lang sa Lupa (International title: Envy / ) is a 2017 Philippine television drama series broadcast by GMA Network. The series is based on a Philippine graphic novel and a 1987 Philippine film of the same title. Directed by Gina Alajar, it stars Julie Anne San Jose and Benjamin Alves. It premiered on January 30, 2017 on the network's Afternoon Prime line up replacing Sa Piling ni Nanay. The series concluded on April 12, 2017 with a total of 53 episodes. It was replaced by D' Originals in its timeslot.

The series is streaming online on YouTube.

Premise
Santina is forced to work after the death of her aunt. She will work for Diony who eventually sends Santina to school and treats her like a daughter. Diony will later adopt Angeli leading Santina and Angeli's vying for Diony's son, Ephraim's love.

Cast and characters

Lead cast
 Julie Anne San Jose as Santina "Tina" Marquez-Esquivel
 Benjamin Alves as Ephraim Sta. Maria Esquivel

Supporting cast
 Martin del Rosario as Francisco "Francis / Kiko" Garela
 LJ Reyes as Angeli "Geli" Martinez / Esquivel
 Ara Mina as Mariz Alejo-Zimmerman
 Jean Garcia as Diony Sta. Maria-Esquivel
 Victor Neri as Cesar Esquivel
 Allan Paule as Hector Marquez
 Geleen Eugenio as Yoleng Sta. Maria
 Janna Dominguez as Chona Garela
 Lharby Policarpio as Boggs
 Koreen Medina as Laureen

Guest cast
 Kyle Ocampo as young Angeli "Geli" Martinez
 Marc Justin Alvarez as young Ephraim Esquivel
 Ar Angel Aviles as young Santina "Tina" Marquez
 Candy Pangilinan as Liza Marquez
 Leanne Bautista as Glenda Esquivel
 Elle Ramirez as Macy Montenegro
 Kiko Matos as Manny Sotto
 Eunice Lagusad as Elma
 Carmen Del Rosario as Lydia
 Leandro Baldemor as Conrad Alejo
 Sheree as Arlene Garela-Alejo
 Afi Africa as Britney
 Gee Canlas as Siony
 Prince Clemente as Ephraim's friend
 Joemarie Nielsen as Ephraim's friend
 Eian Rances as Ephraim's friend
 Kim Rodriguez as Julie
 David Licauco as Aiden
 Ge Villamil as Maring

Episodes

January 2017

February 2017

March 2017

April 2017

Ratings
According to AGB Nielsen Philippines' Nationwide Urban Television Audience Measurement household ratings, the pilot episode of Pinulot Ka Lang sa Lupa earned an 11.4% rating. While the final episode scored a 5.4% rating in Nationwide Urban Television Audience Measurement people in television homes.

Accolades

References

External links
  
 

2017 Philippine television series debuts
2017 Philippine television series endings
Filipino-language television shows
GMA Network drama series
Live action television shows based on films
Television shows set in Quezon City